Brace 4 Impak is the debut studio album by American hip hop production team Da Beatminerz. It was released in 2001 via Rawkus Records, and was produced entirely by Da Beatminerz. The album featured guest appearances from Apani B, Black Moon, Blackhearted Skavangerz, Caron Wheeler, Cocoa Brovas, Cordell, Diamond D, Flipmode Squad, Freddie Foxxx, Heather B. Gardner, Jayo Felony, Jean Grae, Krumb Snatcha, Lord Tariq, Naughty by Nature, Pete Rock, Ras Kass, Royce da 5'9", Shadez Of Brooklyn, Talib Kweli, Tefelar, The Last Emperor, Total, and Vinia Mojica.

The album peaked at number 143 on the Billboard 200, number 38 on the Top R&B/Hip-Hop Albums, and number 2 on the Heatseekers Albums. Its lead single, "Take That", peaked at #67 on the Hot R&B/Hip-Hop Songs and #4 on the Hot Rap Songs.

Track listing

References

External links

2001 debut albums
Rawkus Records albums
East Coast hip hop albums
Albums produced by Da Beatminerz